Children Collide are an Australian indie rock band from Melbourne, Australia. The band consisted of bassist Heath Crawley and vocalist/guitarist Johnny Mackay throughout its initial run, drummer Ryan Caesar quit the band in February 2012.

History 
Children Collide released their debut EP We Three, Brave and True in 2005. 

Their debut album, The Long Now was released on 11 October 2008 and was produced by David Sardy. "Farewell Rocketship" came in at number 66 on the Triple J Hottest 100, 2008

The trio appeared at Triple J's One Night Stand 2009 held in Sale, Victoria, Australia, alongside Hilltop Hoods, Eskimo Joe, and The Butterfly Effect. Their song "Social Currency" was the theme song for the Nine Network's Friday Night Football coverage of the NRL.

Children Collide appeared at the second annual Coaster Music Festival on 12 September 2009, at Gosford Showground on the NSW Central Coast. They appeared alongside Eskimo Joe, Bliss N Eso, Does It Offend You, Yeah?, Van She, and British India.

Their track "Skeleton Dance", remixed by Ladytron, has been included in a downloadable soundtrack for the EA Sports game FIFA 10 and 2K Sports game NBA 2K11.

The band premiered their single "Jellylegs" with The Doctor on Triple J. It had premiered on the 20 May 2010 show.

Theory of Everything was voted Triple J listeners 18th favorite album of 2010. The band appeared twice more in the Triple J Hottest 100, 2010 with "My Eagle" at 60 and "Jellylegs" at 22.

The band ended in 2012 with the departure of drummer Ryan Caeser stating, "touring as a unit is no longer pleasant, and that is that", weeks before the launch and national tour for their third album Monument.

In August 2021, Children Collide released their fourth studio album Time Itself. It's the first album from the trio since reuniting in 2019.

Discography

Studio albums

Extended plays

Singles

Awards and nominations

ARIA Music Awards
The ARIA Music Awards is an annual awards ceremony that recognises excellence, innovation, and achievement across all genres of Australian music.
 

|-
| rowspan="2"| 2011
| Theory of Everything
| Best Rock Album
| 
|-
| "Loveless" (directors David Michod and Flood Projects)
| Best Video
| 
|-
| 2012
| Monument
| Best Rock Album
|

J Award
The J Awards are an annual series of Australian music awards that were established by the Australian Broadcasting Corporation's youth-focused radio station Triple J. They commenced in 2005.

|-
| J Awards of 2011
| "Loveless"
| Australian Video of the Year
|

References

External links 
 
 Children Collide entry at The Indie Music Database

Australian indie rock groups
Musical groups established in 2005
Dine Alone Records artists
Musical groups from Melbourne